Although the process is similar in many animals, this article will deal exclusively with human folliculogenesis.

In biology, folliculogenesis is the maturation of the ovarian follicle, a densely packed shell of somatic cells that contains an immature oocyte. Folliculogenesis describes the progression of a number of small primordial follicles into large preovulatory follicles that occurs in part during the menstrual cycle.

Contrary to male spermatogenesis, which can last indefinitely, folliculogenesis ends when the remaining follicles in the ovaries are incapable of responding to the hormonal cues that previously recruited some follicles to mature. This depletion in follicle supply signals the beginning of menopause.

Overview
The primary role of the follicle is oocyte support. From the whole pool of follicles a woman is born with, only 0.1% of them will rise ovulation, whereas 99.9% will break down (in a process called follicular atresia). From birth, the ovaries of the human female contain a number of immature, primordial follicles. These follicles each contain a similarly immature primary oocyte. At puberty, clutches of follicles begin folliculogenesis, entering a growth pattern that ends in ovulation (the process where the oocyte leaves the follicle) or in atresia (death of the follicle's granulosa cells).

During follicular development, primordial follicles undergo a series of critical changes in character, both histologically and hormonally. First they change into primary follicles and later into secondary follicles. The follicles then transition to tertiary, or antral, follicles. At this stage in development, they become dependent on hormones, particularly FSH which causes a substantial increase in their growth rate. The late tertiary or pre-ovulatory follicle ruptures and discharges the oocyte (that has become a secondary oocyte), ending folliculogenesis.

Follicle ‘selection’ is the process by which a single ‘dominant’ follicle is chosen from the recruited cohort or wave for preferential growth. It has generally been documented to occur once in the early- to mid- follicular phase of the menstrual cycle, leading to ovulation.

Phases of development
Folliculogenesis is continuous, meaning that at any time the ovary contains follicles in many stages of development. The majority of follicles die and never complete development. A few develop fully to produce a secondary oocyte which is released by rupture of the follicle in a process called ovulation.

The growing follicle passes through the following distinct stages that are defined by certain structural characteristics:

In a larger perspective, the whole folliculogenesis, from primordial to preovulatory follicle, belongs to the stage of ootidogenesis of oogenesis.

In addition, follicles that have formed an antrum are called antral follicles or Graafian follicles. Definitions differ in where this shift occurs in the staging given above, with some stating that it occurs when entering the secondary stage, and others stating that it occurs when entering the tertiary stage.

Until the preovulatory stage, the follicle contains a primary oocyte that is arrested in prophase of meiosis I. During the late preovulatory stage, the oocyte continues meiosis and becomes a secondary oocyte, arrested in metaphase II.

Primordial

At 18–22 weeks post-conception, the cortex of the female ovary (foetal female ovary) contains its peak number of follicles (about 4 to 5 million in the average case, but individual peak populations range from 6 to 7 million). These primordial follicles contain immature oocytes surrounded by flat, squamous granulosa cells (support cells) that are segregated from the oocyte's environment by the basal lamina. They are quiescent, showing little to no biological activity. Because primordial follicles can be dormant for up to 50 years in humans, the length of the ovarian cycle does not include this time.

The supply of follicles decreases slightly before birth, and to 500,000 by puberty for the average case (populations at puberty range from 25,000 to 1.5 million). By virtue of the "inefficient" nature of folliculogenesis (discussed later), only 400–500 of these follicles will ever reach the preovulatory stage. At menopause, only 1,000 follicles remain. It seems likely that early menopause occurs for women with low populations at birth, and late menopause occurs for women with high populations at birth, but there is as yet no clinical evidence for this.

The process by which primordial cells 'wake up' is known as initial recruitment. Research has shown that initial recruitment is mediated by the counterbalance of various stimulatory and inhibitory hormones and locally produced growth factors.

Primary

During ovarian follicle activation, the granulosa cells of the primordial follicles change from a flat to a cuboidal structure, marking the beginning of the primary follicle. The oocyte genome is activated and genes become transcribed. Rudimentary paracrine signaling pathways that are vital for communication between the follicle and oocyte are formed. Both the oocyte and the follicle grow dramatically, increasing to almost 0.1 mm in diameter.

Primary follicles develop receptors to follicle stimulating hormone (FSH) at this time, but they are gonadotropin-independent until the antral stage. Research has shown, however, that the presence of FSH accelerates follicle growth in vitro.

A glycoprotein polymer capsule called the zona pellucida forms around the oocyte, separating it from the surrounding granulosa cells.The zona pellucida, which remains with the oocyte after ovulation, contains enzymes that catalyze with sperm to allow penetration.

Secondary
Stroma-like theca cells are recruited by oocyte-secreted signals. They surround the follicle's outermost layer, the basal lamina, and undergo cytodifferentiation to become the theca externa and theca interna. An intricate network of capillary vessels forms between these two thecal layers and begins to circulate blood to and from the follicle.

The late-term secondary follicle is marked histologically and structurally by a fully grown oocyte surrounded by a zona pellucida, approximately nine layers of granulosa cells, a basal lamina, a theca interna, a capillary net, and a theca externa. The development of the antrum also starts taking place in secondary follicle stage

Antrum formation

The formation of a fluid-filled cavity adjacent to the oocyte called the antrum designates the follicle as an antral follicle, in contrast to a so-called preantral follicle that still lacks an antrum. An antral follicle is also called a Graafian follicle.

Definitions differ as to which stage this shift occurs in, with some designating follicles in the secondary stage as antral, and others designating them as preantral.

Early tertiary
In the tertiary follicle, the basic structure of the mature follicle has formed and no novel cells are detectable. Granulosa and theca cells continue to undergo mitotis concomitant with an increase in antrum volume. Tertiary follicles can attain a tremendous size that is hampered only by the availability of FSH, which it is now dependent on.

Under action of an oocyte-secreted morphogenic gradient, the granulosa cells of the tertiary follicle undergo differentiation into four distinct subtypes: corona radiata, surrounding the zona pellucida; membrana, interior to the basal lamina; periantral, adjacent to the antrum and cumulus oophorus, which connects the membrana and corona radiata granulosa cells together. Each type of cell behaves differently in response to FSH.

Theca interna cells express receptors for luteinizing hormone (LH). LH induces the production of androgens by the theca cells, most notably androstendione, which are aromatized by granulosa cells to produce estrogens, primarily estradiol. Consequently, estrogen levels begin to rise.

Late tertiary and preovulatory (the follicular phase of the menstrual cycle)
At this point, the majority of the group of follicles that started growth have died. This process of follicle death is known as atresia, and it is characterized by radical apoptosis of all constituent cells and the oocyte. Although it is not known what causes atresia, the presence of high concentrations of FSH has been shown to prevent it.

A rise in pituitary FSH caused by the disintegration of the corpus luteum at the conclusion of a menstrual cycle precipitates the recruitment of five to seven class 5 follicles to participate in the next cycle. These follicles enter the end of the prior menstrual cycle and transition into the follicular phase of the next one. The selected follicles, called antral follicles, compete with each other for growth-inducing FSH.

The pattern of this emergence of a cohort of five to seven antral follicles is debated. There are theories of continuous recruitment of antral follicles, theories of a single recruitment episode at the end of the luteal phase, and more recently there has been evidence for a recruitment model marked by 2 - 3 waves of follicle recruitment and development during the menstrual cycle (only one of which is actually an ovulatory wave).

In response to the rise of FSH, the antral follicles begin to secrete estrogen and inhibin, which have a negative feedback effect on FSH. Follicles that have fewer FSH-receptors will not be able to develop further; they will show retardation of their growth rate and become atretic. Eventually, only one follicle will be viable. This remaining follicle, called the dominant follicle, will grow quickly and dramatically—up to 20 mm in diameter—to become the preovulatory follicle.

Note: Many sources misrepresent the pace of follicle growth, some even suggesting that it takes only fourteen days for a primordial follicle to become preovulatory. Actually, the follicular phase of the menstrual cycle means the time between selection of a tertiary follicle and its subsequent growth into a preovulatory follicle. The actual time for development of a follicle varies. 

The growth of the dominant follicle during the follicular phase is about 1.5 mm per day (±0.1 mm), both in natural cycles and for any dominant follicle developing while taking combined oral contraceptive pill. Performing controlled ovarian hyperstimulation leads to a greater recruitment of follicles, growing at about 1.6 mm per day.

Ovulation and the corpus luteum
By the end of the follicular (or proliferative) phase of the thirteenth day of the menstrual cycle, the cumulus oophorus layer of the preovulatory follicle will develop an opening, or stigma, and excrete the oocyte with a complement of cumulus cells in a process called ovulation. In natural cycles, ovulation may occur in follicles that are at least 14 mm.

The oocyte is technically still a secondary oocyte, suspended in the metaphase II of meiosis. It will develop into an ootid, and rapidly thereafter into an ovum (via completion of meiosis II) only upon fertilization.  The oocyte will now travel down one of the fallopian tubes to eventually be discharged through menstruation in the case that it is unfertilized or if it is not successfully implanted in the uterus (if previously fertilized).

The ruptured follicle will undergo a dramatic transformation into the corpus luteum, a steroidiogenic cluster of cells that maintains the endometrium of the uterus by the secretion of large amounts of progesterone and minor amounts of estrogen.

These two steps, while not part of folliculogenesis, are included for completeness. They are discussed in their entirety by their respective articles, and placed into perspective by the menstrual cycle article. It is recommended that these three topics be reviewed.

Hormone function
As with most things related to the reproductive system, folliculogenesis is controlled by the endocrine system. Five hormones participate in an intricate process of positive and negative feedback to regulate folliculogenesis. They are:
 gonadotropin-releasing hormone (GnRH) secreted by the hypothalamus
 two gonadotropins:
 follicle-stimulating hormone (FSH)
 luteinizing hormone (LH)
 estrogen
 progesterone

GnRH stimulates the release of FSH and LH from the anterior pituitary gland that will later have a stimulatory effect on follicle growth (not immediately, however, because only antral follicles are dependent on FSH and LH). When theca cells form in the tertiary follicle the amount of estrogen increases sharply (theca-derived androgen is aromatized into estrogen by the granulosa cells).

At low concentration, estrogen inhibits gonadotropins, but high concentration of estrogen stimulates them. In addition, as more estrogen is secreted, more LH receptors are made by the theca cells, inciting theca cells to create more androgen that will become estrogen downstream. This positive feedback loop causes LH to spike sharply, and it is this spike that causes ovulation.

Following ovulation, LH stimulates the formation of the corpus luteum. Estrogen has since dropped to negative stimulatory levels after ovulation and therefore serves to maintain the concentration of FSH and LH. Inhibin, which is also secreted by the corpus luteum, contributes to FSH inhibition. Progesterone, secreted by the corpus luteum, inhibits the follicular growth and maintains the pregnancy.

The endocrine system coincides with the menstrual cycle and goes through thirteen cycles (and thus thirteen LH spikes) during the course of normal folliculogenesis. However, coordinated enzyme signalling and the time-specific expression of hormonal receptors ensures that follicle growth does not become disregulated during these premature spikes.

Number of follicles 
Recently, two publications have challenged the idea that a finite number of follicles are set around the time of birth. Renewal of ovarian follicles from germline stem cells (originating from bone marrow and peripheral blood) was reported in the postnatal mouse ovary. Studies attempting to replicate these results are underway, but a study of populations in 325 human ovaries found no supporting evidence for follicular replenishment.

In 2010, researchers at the University of Edinburgh determined that by the time women are 30 years old, only 10% of their non-growing follicles (NGFs) remain. At birth, women have all their follicles for folliculogenesis, and they steadily decline until menopause.

Depletion of the ovarian reserve
As women (and mice) age, double-strand breaks accumulate in their primordial follicle reserve.  These follicles contain primary oocytes that are arrested in prophase of the first cell division of meiosis. Double-strand breaks are accurately repaired during meiosis by searching for, and building off of, the matching strand (termed “homologous recombinational repair”).  Titus et al. (2013) found that, as humans (and mice) age, expression of four key DNA repair genes necessary for homologous recombinational repair declines in oocytes.  They hypothesized that DNA double-strand break repair is vital for the maintenance of oocyte reserve, and that a decline in efficiency of repair with age plays a key role in the depletion of the ovarian reserve (ovarian aging).

See also

 ovarian follicle
 ovarian follicle activation
 granulosa cells
 fertilization
 menstrual cycle
 ovulation
 reproductive cycle
 spermatogenesis
 Follicular atresia
 Oocyte maturation inhibitor

Additional images

References

External links
 Morphology and Physiology of the Ovary at endotext.org
 The ovary - folliculogenesis and oogenesis at nlm.nih.gov
 Folliculogenesis Graphic Depicting Hormones Involved at anshlabs.com
 Folliculogenesis and Ovulation at gfmer.ch
 Reproductive Physiology at ufp.pt

F
Animal developmental biology
Human female endocrine system